Novi Zagreb is the part of the City of Zagreb located south of the Sava river. Novi Zagreb forms a distinct whole because it is separated from the northern part of the city both by the river and by the levees around Sava. At the same time, it is divided on urban and rural parts.

It is mostly residential, consisting of blocks of flats and tower blocks that were built during the Socialist era (1945–1990). Although it is not as prestigious as downtown Zagreb, it has been praised for its good road network, public transportation connections and abundance of parks.

By 2009, administrative division it is divided into three administrative city districts ("četvrti"): Novi Zagreb - istok (East Novi Zagreb), Novi Zagreb - zapad (West Novi Zagreb) and Brezovica.

Expansion of Novi Zagreb was started by the Zagreb mayor Većeslav Holjevac, when he moved the Zagreb Fair from the downtown Savska Road to the southern bank of the Sava river in 1953. In 1957, first plans for developing Novi Zagreb were introduced, depicting what would later be known as Savski Gaj. The first complete solution for habitation with public and commercial contents was made for the neighborhood Trnsko by urbanists Zdenko Kolacio, Mirko Maretić and Josip Uhlik with horticulturist Mira Wenzler-Halambek in 1959–60. It was followed by plans for neighborhood Zapruđe in 1962–1963, also made by Josip Uhlik.

The revitalization of Novi Zagreb began in early 2000 with numerous projects that are either completed or still ongoing. Completed projects include the construction of Arena Zagreb in the Lanište neighborhood in Novi Zagreb - zapad, along with the Arena Centar shopping and entertainment complex and the numerous adjacent new residential and commercial buildings, parks and plazas, the construction of the new building of the Museum of Modern Art, construction of the Avenue Mall shopping center, renovation of the Bundek park and lake along with the organization of the Bundekfest festival, and the construction of  the "Bundek Centar" residential and commercial complex. Projects that are still in the planning stages are the construction of a new hospital center in Blato neighborhood, construction of a new bridge spanning the Sava river and connecting the Jarun neighborhood with Novi Zagreb, expansion of the public transportation network with new tram lines, construction of a new and larger city zoo and the construction of a new office zone with highrise buildings.

See also 
 Zagreb Hippodrome

Further reading

References

External links

 
Geography of Zagreb